The Ismaili Centre, Lisbon is one of six such centres world-wide. Established in the Palma de Baixo area of Lisbon in 1998, it is a religious, social and cultural meeting place for the Ismaili Muslim community in Portugal.

Establishment 
In December 1996, Portuguese President Jorge Sampaio laid the Foundation Stone of the Ismaili Centre,  and on 11 July 1998, it was officially opened by President Sampio and His Highness the Aga Khan.

The Ismaili community in Portugal has grown since the 1970s, necessitating the need for this new, permanent marker of their presence in Portugal.

Architecture 
The Ismaili Centre, Lisbon is a distinct architectural complex residing in a large space of 18 thousand square meters, 12 thousand of which consist of gardens and patios.  The main religious and meeting space of the local Ismaili Muslim community is located in the lioz stone and glass building located in the Laranjeiras neighbourhood.  

The site was developed following an international competition resulting in the selection of architect Raj Rewal. He was later joined by the office of the Portuguese architect, Frederico Valsassina. The landscaping was entrusted to PROAP.

The Ismaili Centre takes inspiration from the philosophy and traditions of Eastern Islamic architecture, combined with those from the Iberian Peninsula. The principles are highlighted in the composition of space, in the numerous courtyards and fountains, in the stonework and the metal gates and in the Mediterranean flora. The design is influenced by an amalgamation of traditional spatial arrangements of courtyards, such as those in the Alhambra and Fatehpur Sikri, as well as Islamic patterns. 

Fountains, running water and foliage form the landscaping of the six courtyards and external spaces.

Ethos and purpose 
The Ismaili Centres are an example of such spaces of gathering and are symbolic of the permanently present core Ismaili values and traditions.

Since its establishment in 1998, the Ismaili Centre, Lisbon has hosted public exhibitions, lectures, and musical programs.

References 

Ismaili centres
Religion in Portugal
Lisbon